European route E772 is a class B road, part of the International E-road network in Bulgaria. It connects the two sections of the Hemus motorway (A2) constructed so far, and is part of one of the most important transport corridors in the country: from the capital Sofia in the west to Varna and the northern Bulgarian Black Sea Coast in the east.

The road starts near Yablanitsa and ends near Shumen. It serves as a connection between the provincial capitals Shumen, Targovishte, Veliko Tarnovo and Lovech with Sofia and the port of Varna. It is a two-lane road (one lane in each direction). There are few three-lane parts for overtaking. The road surface is in a comparatively good condition since it is one of the main roads in northern Bulgaria and will remain so until the completion of the Hemus motorway.

Route 

 E83 Jablanica
 E85 Veliko Tarnovo
 E70 Šumen

See also
Roads in Bulgaria
Highways in Bulgaria

External links 
 UN Economic Commission for Europe: Overall Map of E-road Network (2007)
 International E-road network

799772
E772